Lacomb is a census-designated place and unincorporated community in Linn County, Oregon, United States, located about  northeast of Lebanon. It was named in December 1889 by W.J. Turnidge, a son of a pioneer. As of the 2019 Census it had a population of 481.

Demographics

References

Unincorporated communities in Linn County, Oregon
Census-designated places in Oregon
1889 establishments in Oregon
Populated places established in 1889
Census-designated places in Linn County, Oregon
Unincorporated communities in Oregon